Goran Đorović (born 11 November 1971) is a Serbian retired footballer who played mainly a central defender but also as a left back.

In his country, he played for Prishtina and Red Star. He spent the rest of his career in Spain after arriving there in 1997, representing Celta, Deportivo and Elche.

Đorović went into coaching upon retiring, serving as the manager of the Serbian national under-21 team.

Club career
Đorović was born in Pristina, Socialist Federal Republic of Yugoslavia. Having initially played for his hometown club FK Priština, he joined Red Star Belgrade in 1993. He went on to appear in exactly 100 league matches and, aged almost 26, moved abroad after signing with Spanish club RC Celta de Vigo.

Soon, interest arose from major teams, such as U.C. Sampdoria and Arsenal. However, he decided to stay at least for the 1998–99 season at Celta, where he would eventually share teams with his brother Zoran (who had absolutely no impact for the Galicians) and play 126 competitive games, his La Liga debut coming on 31 August 1997 in a 2–1 home win against Real Zaragoza.

Having had one attempt to sign the player previously rebuffed, Deportivo de La Coruña manager Javier Irureta signed Đorović in 2001, having already bought him from Red Star four years earlier. However, the player's career at Depor would be constantly marred by injuries as he earned over €2 million per season, one of the highest in the squad.

For 2003–04, Đorović was loaned alongside Dani Mallo, Roberto Acuña and José Manuel, to Elche CF in the second division. After featuring rarely throughout the campaign he returned to Deportivo, and was immediately released despite still having one year in his contract. He retired shortly after.

International career
Đorović made his debut for the Serbia and Montenegro national team on 23 December 1994, playing the second half of a 0–2 friendly loss in Brazil in Porto Alegre. He won 48 caps more in the next seven years, being part of the setups at the 1998 FIFA World Cup (playing in all the matches and minutes during the tournament, as the nation bowed out in the round-of-16) and UEFA Euro 2000.

International statistics

Managerial statistics

References

External links
 
 Celta de Vigo biography 
 Deportivo archives
 
 
 
 
 

1971 births
Living people
Sportspeople from Pristina
Kosovo Serbs
Serbian twins
Twin sportspeople
Yugoslav footballers
Serbian footballers
Association football defenders
Yugoslav First League players
FC Prishtina players
Red Star Belgrade footballers
La Liga players
Segunda División players
RC Celta de Vigo players
Deportivo de La Coruña players
Elche CF players
Serbia and Montenegro international footballers
1998 FIFA World Cup players
UEFA Euro 2000 players
Serbia and Montenegro expatriate footballers
Serbia and Montenegro footballers
Expatriate footballers in Spain
Serbia and Montenegro expatriate sportspeople in Spain
Serbian football managers
Serbia national under-21 football team managers